Perryton is a city in and the county seat of Ochiltree County, Texas, United States. Its population was 8,802 at the 2010 census.

Geography

Perryton is located at  (36.391752, –100.806109).

Climate

Perryton has a borderline cool semiarid climate (Köppen BSk) just short of either a humid subtropical climate (Cfa) or a humid continental climate (Dfa). This indicates heavy continental influence courtesy of its far inland position. Winter weather can be extremely variable, ranging from extremely cold due to Arctic outbreaks from the Yukon to a three-month winter average of six afternoons above  due to hot chinook winds blowing off the Rocky Mountains.

Summers are hot, and mornings remain relatively mild. Nine mornings each year can be expected to stay above , but virtually none stay above , although the temperature did not fall below  on July 10, 2016.

Demographics

2020 census

As of the 2020 United States census, there were 8,492 people, 2,869 households, and 2,161 families residing in the city.

2000 census
At the 2000 census,  7,774 people, 2,785 households and 2,113 families were residing in the city. The population density was 1,753.2 people/sq mi (677.6/km). The 3,180 housing units had an average density of 717.2 per square mile (277.2/km). The racial makeup of the city was 85.23% White, 0.15% African American, 0.98% Native American, 0.40% Asian,  11.11% from other races, and 2.12% from two or more races. Hispanics or Latinos of any race were 34.13% of the population.

Of the 2,785 households,  42.3% had children under the age of 18 living with them, 62.6% were married couples living together, 8.7% had a female householder with no husband present, and 24.1% were not families. About 21.3% of all households were made up of individuals, and 9.5% had someone living alone who was 65 or older. The average household size was 2.77, and the average family size was 3.22.

Age distribution was 31.3% under 18, 8.7% from 18 to 24, 28.9% from 25 to 44, 19.8% from 45 to 64, and 11.3% who were 65  or older. The median age was 33 years. For every 100 females, there were 98.1 males. For every 100 females age 18 and over, there were 94.4 males.

The median household income was $37,363, and the median family income was $45,045. Males had a median income of $31,803 compared with $19,694 for females. The per capita income for the city was $16,431. About 9.7% of families and 13.2% of the population were below the poverty line, including 18.4% of those under age 18 and 10.2% of those age 65 or over.

Education
The City of Perryton is served by the Perryton Independent School District and the Perryton High School.

Notable people

 Caleb Campbell, NFL player
 Jeremy Campbell, 2008 Summer Paralympics athlete
 Ryan Culwell, singer-songwriter
 John Erickson, author of the Hank the Cowdog series
 Keith Flowers, NFL player
 Mickey Gates, member of the Arkansas House of Representatives
 Mike Hargrove, MLB player and manager

Gallery

References

External links

 City of Perryton

Cities in Ochiltree County, Texas
Cities in Texas
County seats in Texas